M31: A Family Romance is the second novel written by Stephen Wright. First published in 1988 by Harmony Books, it is a dark satire about media and mass culture as filtered through the lens of a fictional family with extraterrestrial ties.

The Los Angeles Times reviewed M31 as “a novel of original and wide ambitions, largely achieved.” Laura Miller proposed in 2004 that the “undersung” M31 is a candidate for the Great American Novel.

References

1988 American novels
Harmony Books books